Danzangiin Lundeejantsan (Danzangiin Lundeejantsan; born 25 November 1957) is a Mongolian politician who was Chairman of the State Great Khural from January 2007 to November 2008 and Vice Chairman of the Great Khural from 2004 to 2007. He has been member of the State Great Khural, the Mongolian parliament, since 1990.

References

Members of the State Great Khural
Speakers of the State Great Khural
1957 births
Living people
Mongolian People's Party politicians
National University of Mongolia alumni
People from Ulaanbaatar